Beverle Graves Myers (born March 31, 1951) is an American author of mystery novels and short stories. Her major work is the Tito Amato mystery series set in 18th-century Venice, published by Poisoned Pen Press. She is also the co-author, with Joanne Dobson, of a stand-alone crime novel set in New York City on the eve of World War II. Myers' novels are traditional mysteries which feature a large cast of characters, a deep sense of time and place, and meticulously researched period details.  Myers' short stories are set in a variety of times and places; several stories feature her series characters.

Background
Myers was born and raised in Louisville, Kentucky.  Her father was an attorney, her mother a homemaker.  Myers attended the University of Louisville, earning a BA in History and an MD from the School of Medicine.  She also completed a residency program in psychiatry and practiced at a public mental health clinic in eastern Kentucky for approximately ten years before taking up writing full-time. When not traveling in search of new inspiration, Myers makes her home in Louisville, Kentucky. She has two adult children and four grandchildren.

Career
Myers combined her love of history, opera, Italy, and mystery to write the Tito Amato mystery series. She often states that she fell in love with the mystery genre while reading Agatha Christie as a young girl. She credits Anne Rice's Cry to Heaven and Steven Saylor's Gordianus the Finder series with providing inspiration for her historical series that follows the career of Venetian castrato soprano and amateur sleuth Tito Amato.  Her first novel, Interrupted Aria, was published by Poisoned Pen Press in 2004.  The complete series encompasses six books.  Her first published short story, "A Baroque Phantom," was also set in Venice and has been followed by numerous others.  Four stories which have been published in Alfred Hitchcock Mystery Magazine form a series featuring Nicco Zianni, an 18th-century "Private Eye."

Myers' work has been nominated for the Macavity Award, Kentucky Literary Award, and Derringer Award.  One of her short stories, "Haven City," was named a Notable Story of 2006 by the Million Writers Award.

She is a member of Mystery Writers of America and the Historical Fiction Authors Cooperative.  She has served on the boards of the Midwest Chapter of MWA, HFAC, her local Sisters in Crime chapter, and was Program Chair for the Kentucky Woman's Book Festival 2006.

Novels

Short stories

Articles

References

External links
Beverle Graves Myers Official Website
Poisoned Pen Press
Fantastic Fiction Beverle Graves Myers entry

Historical Fiction eBooks Author Page

1951 births
Living people
Writers from Louisville, Kentucky
21st-century American novelists
American mystery writers
American women novelists
University of Louisville alumni
Writers of historical mysteries
Women mystery writers
21st-century American women writers
Women historical novelists
Novelists from Kentucky
Kentucky women writers